Chrysoteuchia furva is a moth in the family Crambidae. It was described by Hou-Hun Li and Wei-Chun Li in 2010. It is found in Ningxia, China.

References

Crambini
Moths described in 2010
Moths of Asia